Miguel Contreras (September 17, 1952 – May 6, 2005) was an American labor union leader. He "was known as a king-maker for both local and state politicians." Contreras was born in Dinuba, a city in California's agricultural Central Valley, to farmworker parents who had immigrated from Mexico during the 1920s under the Bracero Program.

After meeting Cesar Chávez at a rally for Robert F. Kennedy in the late 1960s, he became an activist for the United Farm Workers. He promoted the Delano Grape Boycott in Toronto, and organized lettuce workers in Salinas. He later led San Francisco hotel workers on a month-long strike. He was recruited by the Hotel Employees and Restaurant Employees Union, who made him a national organizer in Los Angeles. A contest over the leadership of the union's Local 11 led another labor leader, Maria Elena Durazo, to protest his involvement in the dispute. Durazo and Contreras later resolved their differences, and were married in 1988. The couple had one son, Michael.

In 1994 Contreras became political director of the Los Angeles County Federation of Labor, a Central Labor Council of the American Federation of Labor. In 1996, he was elected executive secretary–treasurer of the Fed, a post he held until his death. During his tenure as secretary-treasurer, Contreras reached out to immigrant workers and worked to firmly integrate his union into the Los Angeles political landscape.

In 2000, Contreras led Los Angeles janitors in a strike against building owners that led to their winning a favorable contract. The campaign's success made it a model for the struggles of blue-collar workers nationwide. He was also a major figure in the transportation workers' strike of the same year, enlisting Jesse Jackson as a mediator in negotiations between the Los Angeles Metropolitan Transportation Authority and the union. Significantly, Contreras put the County Fed's support behind that union even though it was not a member of the Fed; many saw his action as a way to build bridges between the large Latino membership in the Fed and the transit workers' largely African-American membership.  He organized one of the largest immigrant-rights rallies in U.S. history, which drew some 20,000 people to the Los Angeles Sports Arena.

On May 6, 2005, Contreras suffered and died from complications of a heart attack in a Downtown Los Angeles botánica, a dispensary of traditional herbal medicines, where he had gone to have his fortune told. 

A high school in Los Angeles, the Miguel Contreras Learning Complex, is named in his honor. For his recognition, UC Berkeley and UCLA established the Miguel Contreras Labor Program (MCLP) to support labor education.

References

American trade union leaders
Trade unionists from California
American people of Mexican descent
People from Dinuba, California
2005 deaths
1952 births